{{DISPLAYTITLE:C18H23N}}
The molecular formula C18H23N (molar mass: 253.38 g/mol, exact mass: 253.1830 u) may refer to:

 Tolpropamine
 Trimethyldiphenylpropylamine (N,N,1-Trimethyl-3,3-diphenylpropylamine)